The Howell Mountain AVA is an American Viticultural Area located within Napa Valley AVA of California.

Location
The AVA is located in the Howell Mountains within the Vaca Range on the northeast side of Napa Valley around the town of Angwin, and overlooks the town of St. Helena, California. The boundaries of the AVA are dictated by vineyard land located at elevations at least .

History
Prior to Prohibition in the United States, the region was widely known for its Zinfandel but in the mid to late 20th century Cabernet Sauvignon became the dominant grape variety.

Designated an AVA in 1983 due to research predominantly done by Bill Smith formerly of La Jota and later W. H. Smith Wines, Howell Mountain was the first sub-appellation within Napa Valley AVA. The mountain does get cool breezes directly from the Pacific Ocean, and the relatively high elevations result in a cooler climate than on the valley floor. The soil in the appellation is volcanic with excellent drainage.

References

External links 
Howell Mountain Vintners & Growers Association Retrieved Nov. 5, 2010.

American Viticultural Areas of the San Francisco Bay Area
Geography of Napa County, California
American Viticultural Areas
1983 establishments in California